Pravdinsky District is an administrative district (raion), one of the fifteen in Kaliningrad Oblast, Russia. It is located in the south of the oblast. Its administrative center is the town of Pravdinsk. Population:  21,076 (2002 Census);  The population of Pravdinsk accounts for 22.7% of the district's total population.

Geography
The district is situated in the south of the oblast, at the border with Poland. It is sparsely populated. The Lava River flows through the district.

Administrative and municipal status
Within the framework of administrative divisions, Pravdinsky District is one of the fifteen in the oblast.

As a municipal division, the district has been incorporated as Pravdinsky Urban Okrug since May 5, 2015. Prior to that date, the district was incorporated as Pravdinsky Municipal District, which was subdivided into two urban settlements and two rural settlements.

Economy
District economy is agrarian. No major roads or railways pass through the district, yet bus lines carry the public transit.

References

Notes

Sources

Districts of Kaliningrad Oblast